The Care And Handling Of Roses With Thorns is a novel written by Margaret Dilloway.  The novel was released in August 2012.  The book is about a rose breeder and teacher who also has kidney disease.  Dilloway states that the inspiration for this book came from her sister-in-law, who had three kidney transplants where she ultimately died of kidney failure in 2011. The teaching portion of the character comes from Dilloway's teaching experiences and those of her sister-in-law, who was also a high school teacher.

Awards
The book won the Reference and User Services Association of the American Library Association 2012 award for top Women's Fiction.
Entertainment Weekly gives the book a B+ rating.

References

External links
 The Care and Handling of Roses With Thorns on Goodreads

2012 American novels
G. P. Putnam's Sons books